Fayette County is a county in the U.S. state of West Virginia. As of the 2020 census, the population was 40,488. Its county seat is Fayetteville. It is part of the Beckley, WV Metropolitan Statistical Area in Southern West Virginia.

History
Fayette County—originally Fayette County, Virginia—was created by the Virginia General Assembly in February 1831, from parts of Greenbrier, Kanawha, Nicholas, and Logan counties. It was named in honor of the Marquis de la Fayette, who had played a key role assisting the Continental Army during the American Revolutionary War.

The second Virginia county so named, it was among the 50 counties which Virginia lost when West Virginia was admitted to the Union as the 35th state in 1863, during the American Civil War. The earlier Fayette County, Virginia existed from 1780 to 1792, and was lost when Kentucky was admitted to the Union. Accordingly, in the government records of Virginia, there will be listings for Fayette County from 1780 to 1792 and Fayette County from 1831 to 1863.

A substantial portion was subdivided from Fayette County to form Raleigh County in 1850. In 1871, an Act of the West Virginia Legislature severed a small portion to form part of Summers County.

In 1863, West Virginia's counties were divided into civil townships, with the intention of encouraging local government.  This proved impractical in the heavily rural state, and in 1872 the townships were converted into magisterial districts.  Fayette County was originally divided into four townships: Falls, Fayetteville, Mountain Cove, and Sewell Mountain.  A fifth township, Kanawha, was formed from part of Falls Township in 1870.  The portion of Fayette County that was taken to form Summers County was from Sewell Mountain Township.  In 1872, the county's five townships were converted into magisterial districts.  A sixth district, Quinnimont, was organized in the 1880s, and a seventh, Nuttall, was formed from part of Mountain Cove District in the 1890s.  In the 1970s, the historic magisterial districts were consolidated into three new districts: New Haven, Plateau, and Valley.

Fayette County was the location of a disastrous mine explosion at Red Ash in March 1900, in which 46 miners were killed.

Fayette County elected several African Americans to the West Virginia House of Delegates during the early decades of the 20th century including the first, second and third who served in the state legislature.

Geography
Plum Orchard Lake, a reservoir southwest of Oak Hill, is the second largest lake in West Virginia.

Major highways

  Interstate 64
  Interstate 77
  U.S. Route 19
  U.S. Route 60
  West Virginia Route 16
  West Virginia Route 39
  West Virginia Route 41
  West Virginia Route 61
  West Virginia Route 612

Adjacent counties
 Nicholas County (north)
 Greenbrier County (east)
 Summers County (southeast)
 Raleigh County (south)
 Kanawha County (west)

National protected areas
 Gauley River National Recreation Area (part)
 New River Gorge National Park and Preserve (part)

Demographics

2000 census
As of the census of 2000, there were 47,579 people, 18,945 households, and 13,128 families living in the county.  The population density was 72 people per square mile (28/km2).  There were 21,616 housing units at an average density of 33 per square mile (13/km2).  The racial makeup of the county was 92.74% White, 5.57% Black or African American, 0.27% Native American, 0.30% Asian, 0.04% Pacific Islander, 0.15% from other races, and 0.93% from two or more races.  0.68% of the population were Hispanic or Latino of any race.

There were 18,945 households, out of which 29.00% had children under the age of 18 living with them, 52.10% were married couples living together, 13.20% had a female householder with no husband present, and 30.70% were non-families. 26.90% of all households were made up of individuals, and 13.40% had someone living alone who was 65 years of age or older.  The average household size was 2.41 and the average family size was 2.89.

In the county, the population was spread out, with 21.70% under the age of 18, 9.60% from 18 to 24, 27.10% from 25 to 44, 25.10% from 45 to 64, and 16.40% who were 65 years of age or older.  The median age was 40 years. For every 100 females there were 98.20 males.  For every 100 females age 18 and over, there were 94.70 males.

The median income for a household in the county was $24,788, and the median income for a family was $30,243. Males had a median income of $28,554 versus $18,317 for females. The per capita income for the county was $13,809.  About 18.20% of families and 21.70% of the population were below the poverty line, including 31.90% of those under age 18 and 13.70% of those age 65 or over.

2010 census
As of the 2010 United States Census, there were 46,039 people, 18,813 households, and 12,459 families living in the county. The racial makeup of the county was 93.5% white, 4.6% black or African American, 0.2% Asian, 0.2% American Indian, 0.2% from other races, and 1.3% from two or more races. Those of Hispanic or Latino origin made up 0.9% of the population. In terms of ancestry, 16.9% were German, 15.5% were Irish, 10.8% were English, and 9.5% were American.

Of the 18,813 households, 28.6% had children under the age of 18 living with them, 48.7% were married couples living together, 12.5% had a female householder with no husband present, 33.8% were non-families, and 29.1% of all households were made up of individuals. The average household size was 2.35 and the average family size was 2.87. The median age was 43.0 years.

The median income for a household in the county was $31,912 and the median income for a family was $42,077. Males had a median income of $39,301 versus $24,874 for females. The per capita income for the county was $17,082. About 16.4% of families and 21.3% of the population were below the poverty line, including 30.9% of those under age 18 and 12.5% of those age 65 or over.

Politics
Fayette County's political history is typical of West Virginia as a whole. The county leaned Democratic during the Third Party System before the power of industrial and mining political systems turned it strongly towards the Republican Party between 1880 and 1932. Unionization of its predominant coal mining workforce during the New Deal made the county powerfully Democratic between 1932 and 2008: no Republican in this period except Richard Nixon against the strongly leftist George McGovern won forty percent of the county's vote, and Lyndon Johnson in 1964 exceeded eighty percent against the conservative Barry Goldwater. However, the decline of mining unions and the out-migration of historical black mining families, has produced a rapid swing to the Republican Party – so that over the past three presidential elections swings to the Republican Party have averaged thirty percentage points and Democratic vote percentages plummeted to levels historically more typical of Unionist, traditionally Republican counties like Morgan or Upshur.

Economy
The county has a tradition of coal mining, which still serves as a primary source of employment in the area.  A Georgia Pacific lumber mill has its home to the west of Mt. Hope, adjacent to U.S. Route 19.  There exists a large metal alloy plant in Alloy.  The Mount Olive Correctional Complex, West Virginia's only maximum security state prison, is also located in Fayette County. 
The economy has shifted significantly in recent years, with a large amount of money being spent in outdoor recreation and tourism.

Notable people
 George Cafego, All-American football player at University of Tennessee, first player selected in the 1940 NFL Draft
 DJ Cheese, first DMC World DJ Champion (1986)
 Walt Craddock, former professional baseball player
 Bob Elkins, character actor
 Randy Gilkey, singer, songwriter, and music producer
 Tunney Hunsaker, professional boxer and former police chief
 Julia Neale Jackson, mother of Stonewall Jackson
 Harley M. Kilgore, former member of the United States Senate
 Jason Kincaid, professional wrestler, former NWA World Junior Heavyweight Champion
 John McClung, musician and performer of old-time music
 Charlie McCoy, musician and singer
 MacGillivray Milne, former governor of America Samoa
 Tom Pridemore, former safety from Ansted, West Virginia who played eight seasons in the NFL for the Atlanta Falcons and served one term as a legislator
 Timothy Truman, writer, artist, musician
 Lonnie Warwick, professional football player

Communities

Cities
 Montgomery (part)
 Mount Hope
 Oak Hill
 Smithers (part)

Towns
 Ansted
 Fayetteville (county seat)
 Gauley Bridge
 Meadow Bridge
 Town of Pax
 Thurmond

Magisterial districts
 New Haven
 Plateau
 Valley

Census-designated places

 Beards Fork
 Boomer
 Charlton Heights
 Cunard
 Deep Water
 Dixie (part)
 Falls View
 Garten
 Gatewood
 Glen Ferris
 Glen Jean
 Hico
 Hilltop
 Kimberly
 Kincaid
 Minden
 Mount Carbon
 Page
 Powellton
 Prince
 Scarbro

Unincorporated communities

 Agnew
 Alloy
 Alta
 Beckwith
 Boonesborough
 Brooklyn
 Brown
 Cannelton
 Caperton
 Carlisle
 Chimney Corner
 Clifftop
 Columbia
 Corliss
 Danese
 Dempsey
 Dothan
 Eagle
 Edmond
 Elkridge
 Fayette
 Greenstown
 Hamilton
 Harvey
 Hilton Village
 Hopewell
 Jodie
 Kanawha Falls
 Kingston
 Landisburg
 Lansing
 Layland
 Lochgelly
 Lookout
 McDunn
 Mahan
 Marvel
 Maywood
 Montgomery Heights
 Mossy
 Nallen
 North Page
 Nuttall
 Nuttalburg
 Oak Ridge
 Pine Grove
 Ramsey
 Red Star
 Robson
 Russellville
 Sanger
 Smithers
 Toney Creek
 Victor
 Whipple
 Winona
 Wriston

See also
 Babcock State Park
 Battle of Fayetteville (1862 Western Virginia)
 Beury Mountain Wildlife Management Area
 Bridge Day
 Coal camps in Fayette County, West Virginia
 Hawks Nest State Park
 Plum Orchard Lake Wildlife Management Area
 National Register of Historic Places listings in Fayette County, West Virginia
 Fayette County Schools (West Virginia)

References

External links
 Fayette County Chamber of Commerce
 Fayette County Schools
 Fayette County Public Libraries
 WVGenWeb Fayette County

 
1831 establishments in Virginia
Populated places established in 1831
Counties of Appalachia
Former counties of Virginia